The Horten H.VIII was a flying wing research aircraft designed by Reimar Horten during World War II and only partly built by the end of the war.

Design
The H.VIII was conceived in 1943 as a flying wind tunnel, as Horten himself was denied access to the existing facilities. Following his usual swept and tapered flying wing pattern, a large open-ended test chamber was fitted beneath the centre section.

It was to be powered by six Argus As 10  engines driving pusher propellers.

Construction was of mixed wood and metal. Horten had difficulties in obtaining timbers of sufficient quality and length, and the site was overrun by the Allies before the airframe could be finished.

Specifications (H.VIII)

References

Notes

Bibliography
 Lee, Russell E. (2020). Only the Wing. Smithsonian.

Flying wings
H08